Duhamel is an historic surname from Northern French and Belgian families, especially from Normandy, Picardy and the Romance Low Countries (Artois and Romance Flanders), meaning from the hamlet, or from home as the word hamlet comes from the root word home. By migration, this surname is also frequent in the east of France and Switzerland and by offshore migration in the US and mainly in Canada. The name may refer to:

People
Alain Duhamel (born 1940), French journalist
Antoine Duhamel (1925–2014), French composer
Denise Duhamel (born 1961), American poet
Georges Duhamel (1884–1966), French writer
Helen Duhamel (1904–1991), American businesswoman and broadcaster 
Henri-Louis Duhamel du Monceau (1700–1782), French physician, naval engineer and botanist, whose standard abbreviation as a botanist is Duhamel
Henry Duhamel (1853–1917), French mountaineer, author and skiing pioneer
James F. Duhamel (1858–1947), New York state senator, and Washington DC patent attorney
Jean-Marie Duhamel (1797–1872), French applied mathematician
Jean-Baptiste Duhamel (1624–1706), French scientist and theologian
Jean-Pierre-François Guillot-Duhamel (1730–1816), French engineer
Jonathan Duhamel (born 1987), Canadian professional poker player and winner of the 2010 World Series of Poker Main Event.
Joseph-Thomas Duhamel (1841–1909), Canadian clergyman and educator
Josh Duhamel (born 1972), American fashion model and actor
Marcel Duhamel (1900–1977), French actor, screenwriter, translator and publisher
Maurice Duhamel (1884–1940), French composer and Breton nationalist
Meagan Duhamel (born 1985), Canadian figure skater
Miguel Duhamel, (born 1968), Canadian professional motorcycle racer
Olivier Duhamel, (born 1950), French academic and politician
Ron Duhamel (1938–2002), Canadian politician
Yvon Duhamel (1939–2021), Canadian professional motorcycle and snowmobile racer

Places
Duhamel, Alberta, Canada
Duhamel, Quebec, Canada
Duhamel-Ouest, Quebec, Canada

Others
Duhamel's principle or Duhamel's formula, a general method for obtaining solutions to inhomogeneous linear evolution equations
Duhamel's integral is used in engineering / response theory to calculate the response of a linear system to an arbitrary excitation, provided the excitation to an impulse function is known
19617 Duhamel, an asteroid named for Jean-Marie Duhamel
 the Duhamel procedure, an operation to treat Hirschsprung's disease

Surnames of Norman origin
French-language surnames